Myrie is a surname. People with this surname include:

Association football
 David Myrie (born 1988), Costa Rican footballer
 Roy Myrie (born 1982), Costa Rican  footballer

Other
 Clive Myrie (born 1964), BBC journalist and presenter
 Eliza Myrie (born 1981), American artist
 Evelyn Myrie (born 1959), community activist in Hamilton, Ontario, Canada 
 Zellnor Myrie (born 1986), New York politician